The Movement for a United Communist Party of Greece was a minor Greek political organisation.

The movement was established in 1993 as the union of the pro-Albanian Organisation of Marxist-Leninist Communists of Greece (OKMLE -not to be confused with OMLE) and exiled Greek communists from the former Soviet Union and other ex-socialist countries, old EAM-ELAS soldiers and officers, followers of Nikolaos Zachariadis who disconnected with Communist Party of Greece (KKE) after its De-Stalinization the period 1953–1956.

It was a Stalinist organization which struggled for the unification of all Greek communists in one Marxist–Leninist party.

In 1996, it merged with communists publishing the newspaper Post-Soviet Epoch and other independent Greek Stalinists to form Movement for the Reorganization of the Communist Party of Greece 1918-55.

The organization published a biweekly 4-pages newspaper called Voice of Truth with size 28 cm x 31.5 cm. The first issue published in July 1993 and the last in August 1996. There were published 63 issues in total.

It didn't participate in any elections.

See also
Politics of Greece

External links
Voice of Truth - blog, maintained by the Movement for the Reorganization of the Communist Party of Greece 1918–55, in Greek

Defunct communist parties in Greece
Defunct political parties in Greece
Anti-revisionist organizations
Political parties established in 1993
1993 establishments in Greece
Political parties disestablished in 1996
1996 establishments in Greece
1990s in Greek politics
Hoxhaist parties
Stalinist parties